Ghyslaine Côté (born September 6, 1955) is a Canadian director, screenwriter and actor. She is best known for directing The Five of Us , which won the Prize for most popular Canadian film and the prize for best artistic contribution at the 2004 Montreal World Film Festival.

Filmography 

 Effusion - 1985
 Femmes sans frontières - 1985
 Jeanne & Jeanne - 1985
 Coup de chance - 1992
 Aux voleurs! - 1993
 Meanwhile (Pendant ce temps...) - short, 1998
 Pin-Pon, le film - 1999
 Bliss - 2002
 The Five of Us (Elles étaient cinq) - 2004

References

External links 

 

Canadian women film directors
Film directors from Quebec
Canadian women screenwriters
Canadian film actresses